Fushimi may refer to:

Emperor Fushimi of Japan
Fushimi, Kyoto, a ward of Kyoto city
Fushimi, Nagoya, a neighbourhood in Nagoya
Fushimi (surname), a Japanese surname
Fushimi-no-miya, a branch of the Japanese Imperial Family